The 2013 North Carolina Tar Heels football team represented the University of North Carolina at Chapel Hill as a member of Coastal Division of the Atlantic Coast Conference (ACC) during the 2013 NCAA Division I FBS football season. The team was led by second-year head coach Larry Fedora and played their home games at Kenan Memorial Stadium. The Tar Heels finished the season 7–6 overall and 4–4 in ACC play to place fifth in the Coastal Division. They were invited to the Belk Bowl, where they defeated Cincinnati.

Before the season

Previous season
In his first year as head coach in a season that the UNC football team was ineligible for the ACC title, a bowl game and a ranking in the USA Today Coaches' Poll, Larry Fedora led the team to an 8–4 record. The offense finished the season ranked 14th out of 120 teams in terms of total yards per game. The defense finished the season ranked 56th out of 120 teams in terms of opponent total yards per game. North Carolina had at least eight victories in four of the five years from 2008 to 2012. The eight wins in 2008 and 2009 were vacated due to NCAA penalty. The last time North Carolina had more than eight victories was in 1997.

Spring practice
Marquise Williams, Bryn Renner's backup quarterback in the 2012 season, was not enrolled in classes at UNC in the spring semester. UNC coach Larry Fedora said Williams may re-enroll at UNC during the summer. After the spring football game in April 2013, Fedora said that if the season started, early enrollee freshman quarterback Mitch Trubisky would be the second-string quarterback.

Recruiting

Prior to National Signing Day, four high school players that graduated early and received scholarship offers to play football at North Carolina enrolled for the spring semester, allowing them to participate in spring practice. These included: quarterback Mitch Trubisky, wide receiver Jordan Fieulleteau, running back Kris Francis, and offensive tackle R. J. Prince. On February 6, 2013 thirteen additional players signed their National Letter of Intent to play at North Carolina that completed the 2013 recruiting class. Based on the March 2012 sanctions from the NCAA, North Carolina could only sign a maximum of 20 players per year for the next two years versus the regular limit of 25.

North Carolina's recruiting class was highlighted by five players from the "ESPN 300": No. 118 Brian Walker (CB); No. 159 Greg Webb (DT); No. 194 Johnathan Howard (WR); No. 219 Mitch Trubisky (QB); No. 275 Jordan Fieulleteau (WR). The Tar Heels signed the No. 42 recruiting class according to Rivals.com and the No. 29 recruiting class according to Scout.com. ESPN had North Carolina's class as the No. 21 recruiting class in the nation.

Personnel

Coaching staff
North Carolina head coach Larry Fedora entered his second year as the North Carolina's head coach for the 2013 season. After his first year of coaching, Fedora led the Tar Heels to an eight wins and four losses, but post season ineligibility ended their season after their final regular season game. Defensive line coach Deke Adams left the Tar Heels to coach the same position at South Carolina. On February 5, 2013, Illinois defensive line coach Keith Gilmore was hired to replace Deke Adams. David Duggan the outside linebackers coach and special teams coordinator left North Carolina for Southern Mississippi after one season of coaching. Larry Fedora then hired Arizona State coach Ron West to become the new co-defensive coordinator and linebackers coach.

Returning starters

Depth chart

Schedule

NFL Draft
Five former players were selected in the 2014 NFL Draft:

References

North Carolina
North Carolina Tar Heels football seasons
Duke's Mayo Bowl champion seasons
North Carolina Tar Heels football